RMIT's School of Fashion and Textiles is an Australian tertiary education school within the College of Design and Social Context at the Royal Melbourne Institute of Technology (RMIT University), located in Melbourne, Victoria.

See also
RMIT University

References

External links
School of Fashion and Textiles

Fashion and Textiles
Design schools
Fashion schools
Textile schools
Australian fashion